Kalarayerkuthi is a village in the Cooch Behar II CD block in the Cooch Behar Sadar subdivision of the Cooch Behar district in the state of West Bengal, India.

Geography

Location

Area overview
The map alongside shows the north-central part of the district. It has the highest level of urbanisation in an overwhelming rural district. 22.08% of the population of the Cooch Behar Sadar subdivision lives in the urban areas and 77.92% lives in the rural areas. The entire district forms the flat alluvial flood plains of mighty rivers.

Note: The map alongside presents some of the notable locations in the subdivision. All places marked in the map are linked in the larger full screen map.

Civic administration

CD block HQ
The headquarters of the Cooch Behar II CD block are located at Kalarayerkuthi.

Demographics
As per the 2011 Census of India, Kalarayerkuthi had a total population of 20,739. There were 10,812 (52%) males and 9,927 (48%) females. There were 2,444 persons in the age range of 0 to 6 years. The total number of literate people in Kalarayerkuthi was 14,798 (80.89% of the population over 6 years).

References

Villages in Cooch Behar district